VK Bečej (full name: Vaterpolo klub Bečej; lit. Water polo club Bečej), was a water polo club from Bečej, Serbia. Founded in 1947, the club disbanded in 2002 due to the bad financial situation.

History
The club was established in 1947. Its golden years came in the mid-1990s, when the club won the National Championships and National Cups of FR Yugoslavia for six consecutive seasons, from 1995–96 to 2000–01 season. VK Bečej also made LEN Champions League Final Four appearances in 1997 and 1998.

The biggest success in club's history was winning the 1999–2000 LEN Champions League trophy, becoming only the second Serbian team after VK Partizan to win the top-tier European water polo club competition. Aleksandar Šapić led the team to the 1999–00 title, scoring 5 goals in the final versus Zagreb-based HAVK Mladost on 27 May 2000. He was also that year's Euroleague best scorer with 39 goals in the season. In 2001, VK Bečej made its last Champions League Final Four appearance.

The club's president during this golden era was Đorđe "Badža" Predin. The prominent Serbian company Sojaprotein sponsored the club in this period.

Rosters

Champions League winning squad

 Aleksandar Šoštar
 Slobodan Soro
 Predrag Zimonjić
 Goran Krstonošić
 Nenad Vukanić
 Nedeljko Rodić
 Branko Peković
 Aleksandar Ćirić
 Veljko Uskoković
 László Tóth
 István Mészáros
 Aleksandar Šapić
 Jugoslav Vasović
 Balázs Vincze
 Nebojša Milić

Notable former players
 Milan Tričković

Notable former coaches   
 Vlaho Orlić
 Nikola Stamenić
 Zoltán Kásás
 Mirko Blažević

Honours
National Championship
Winners (6) : 1996, 1997, 1998, 1999, 2000 and 2001
National Cup
Winners (6) :  1996, 1997, 1998, 1999, 2000 and 2001
Champions League 
Winners (1) : 1999/00
Final Four (3) : 1997, 1998, 2001

References

External links
 

Bečej
Bečej
Bečej
Bečej